Investment Saskatchewan Inc. is a Crown corporation owned by the Government of Saskatchewan that invests in Saskatchewan companies.  Investments are a minimum of $3M CDN. The investments are managed through a private sector venture capital investment company called Victoria Park Capital Inc.

References

Crown corporations of Saskatchewan
Sovereign wealth funds
Financial services companies based in Saskatchewan
Companies based in Regina, Saskatchewan
Investment companies of Canada